Crenuchus spilurus, the sailfin tetra, is a species belonging to the South American darter family, Crenuchidae. It is found in the Amazon and Orinoco Basins, as well as various river Basins in the Guianas. It is the only member of its genus.

References

Crenuchidae
Tetras
Monotypic fish genera
Freshwater fish of Brazil
Freshwater fish of Colombia
Freshwater fish of Peru
Fish of the Amazon basin
Taxa named by Albert Günther